A special election was held in  on April 26–28, 1808 to fill a vacancy left by the resignation, on February 5, 1808, of David Thomas (DR), who had been appointed New York State Treasurer. This election was held at the same time as the 1808 Congressional elections. The special election was held in the territory of the old 12th district

Election results

Wilson took his seat on November 7, 1808

See also
List of special elections to the United States House of Representatives

References

New York 1808 12
New York 1808 12
1808 12
New York 12
United States House of Representatives 12
United States House of Representatives 1808 12